Humpbacks: From Fire to Ice is a 2008 nature documentary narrated by David Attenborough and directed by Ross Isaacs. The subject of the film is a newborn humpback whale and its first year of life. The film was produced by ABC1, and premiered on 16 November 2008. The documentary explores the mating, courting, and feeding behaviours of the whales.

References

Documentary films about marine biology